Healing the deaf mute of Decapolis is one of the miracles of Jesus in the Gospels, namely Mark 7:31-37. Its narration offers many parallels with the healing of the blind man of Bethsaida in Mark 8:22-26.

Biblical accounts
According to the Gospel of Mark, when Jesus entered the region of the Decapolis after passing through Sidon and down the Sea of Galilee, some people brought to him a man who was deaf and could hardly talk, and they begged Jesus to place his hand on him. This account follows the healing of the daughter of a Syro-Phoenician woman who speaks with Jesus about whether his mission extends to the gentiles (Mark 7:24-30). The deaf-mute man lives in the gentile Decapolis region, although the text does not specify that he is a gentile. The Gospel of Mark states:

Analysis
New Testament commentator Lamar Williamson writes that this is the last unit in a series of miracles concerned with the identity of Jesus, as subsequently confirmed by the Apostle Peter's christological affirmation in Mark 8:29, where Peter exclaimed: "You are the Messiah".

Roger Baxter in his meditations, reflects on the question, What is spiritual dumbness?, writing, "He is spiritually dumb, who does not correct his brother, when by doing so, he can prevent him from sinning. He also is spiritually dumb, who does not preach the Word of God, when it is his duty, or make open profession of his faith, when the honor of God, his own or neighbor's good requires it. Lastly, he labors under this spiritual complaint, whose tongue is not employed in the praises of God, in the exercises of devotion and pious conversations. "Wo is me," says the prophet, "because I held my peace." (Isa 6:6.) And, " you that are mindful of the Lord hold not your peace."" (Isa 62:6.)

See also
 Life of Jesus in the New Testament
 Ministry of Jesus
 New Testament places associated with Jesus
 Parables of Jesus
 Muteness

References

Miracles of Jesus
Deafness
Communication disorders
Supernatural healing
Muteness